The shortfin lizardfish (Saurida micropectoralis) is a species of lizardfish that lives mainly off the coast of Japan.

Information
S. micropectoralis is known to be found in a marine environment within a demersal depth range of 20 – 260 meters. This species is native to a tropical climate. This species is identified by its elongated, brown body with a white underside. It has dark colored fins. S. micropectoralis commonly occupy the areas of Indo-West Pacific, Andaman, South China seas, south to the Arafura Sea, and northern Australia. The diet of this species includes small bottom-dwelling invertebrates and fishes.

Common names
The common names of S. micropectoralis in different languages are as follows:
Korean : Chan-bi-nul-mae-t'ung-i 
Japanese : Koukai-tokage-eso 
 English : Shortfin lizardfish 
Mandarin : Xiao lín shé zi 
Korean :  잔비늘매퉁이

References

Notes
 

Synodontidae
Fish described in 1972